The following is a list of coaches, including role(s) and year(s) of service, for the Boston Red Sox American League franchise (1901–present), known during its early history as the Boston Americans (1901–1907).

Bench coach 

 Bing Miller: 1937
 Don Zimmer: July 25, 1992 – end of season
 Tim Johnson: 1995–1996
 Grady Little: 1997–1999
 Buddy Bailey: 2000
 Dave Jauss: 2001
 Mike Stanley: 2002
 Jerry Narron: 2003
 Brad Mills: 2004–2009
 DeMarlo Hale: 2010–2011
 Tim Bogar: 2012
 Torey Lovullo: 2013–2016 (leave of absence from mid-August 2015 through end of season)
 Dana LeVangie: August 16, 2015–end of season (interim)
 Gary DiSarcina: 2017
 Ron Roenicke: 2018–2019
 Jerry Narron: 2020
 Will Venable: 2021–2022
 Ramón Vázquez: 2023–present

Third base coach 

 Al Schacht: 1935–1936
 Tom Daly: 1937–1943
 Bill Burwell: 1944
 Del Baker: 1945–1948
 Kiki Cuyler: 1949
 Steve O'Neill: 1950
 Eddie Mayo: 1951
 Ski Melillo: 1952–1953
 Buster Mills: 1954
 Jack Burns: 1955–1959
 Billy Herman: 1960–1964
 Billy Gardner: 1965–1966
 Eddie Popowski: 1967–1973
 Don Zimmer: 1974 – July 18, 1976
 Eddie Popowski: July 19, 1976–end of season
 Eddie Yost: 1977–1984
 Rene Lachemann: 1985–1986
 Joe Morgan: 1987–July 10, 1988
 Rac Slider: July 15, 1988–1990
 Dick Berardino: 1991
 Don Zimmer: 1992–July 24, 1992
 Rick Burleson: July 25, 1992–1993
 Gary Allenson: 1994
 Dave Oliver: 1995–1996
 Wendell Kim: 1997–2000
 Gene Lamont: 2001
 Mike Cubbage: 2002–2003
 Dale Sveum: 2004–2005
 DeMarlo Hale: 2006–2009
 Tim Bogar: 2010–2011
 Jerry Royster: 2012
 Brian Butterfield: 2013–2017
 Carlos Febles: 2018–present

First base coach 

 Herb Pennock: 1936–April 28, 1939
 Hugh Duffy: 1939
 Moe Berg: 1940–1941
 Larry Woodall: 1942–1947
 Earle Combs: 1948–1952
 Del Baker: 1953–1958
 Rudy York: 1959–1962
 Harry Malmberg: 1963–1964
 Pete Runnels: 1965–1966
 Bobby Doerr: 1967–1969
 Don Lenhardt: 1970–1973
 Eddie Popowski: 1974
 Johnny Pesky: 1975–1979
 Tommy Harper: 1980–1984
 Joe Morgan: 1985
 Walt Hriniak: 1986–1987
 Al Bumbry: 1988–1993
 Frank White: 1994–1996
 Dave Jauss: 1997–1999
 Tommy Harper: 2000–2002
 Dallas Williams: 2003
 Lynn Jones: 2004–2005 (leave of absence during May–July 2004)
 Bill Haselman: May 6, 2004 – July 22, 2004 (interim)
 Bill Haselman: 2006
 Luis Alicea: 2007–2008
 Tim Bogar: 2009
 Ron Johnson: 2010–2011 (leave of absence final during two months of 2010)
 Rob Leary: August 1, 2010 – end of season (interim)
 Alex Ochoa: 2012
 Arnie Beyeler: 2013–2015
 Rubén Amaro Jr.: 2016–2017
 Tom Goodwin: 2018–2021
 Ramón Vázquez: 2022
 Kyle Hudson: 2023–present

Hitting coach 

 Rudy York: 1959–1962
 Bobby Doerr: 1967–1969
 Johnny Pesky: 1980–1984
 Walt Hriniak: 1985–1988
 Richie Hebner: 1989–1991
 Rick Burleson: 1992
 Mike Easler: 1993–1994
 Jim Rice: 1995–2000
 Rick Down: 2001
 Dwight Evans: 2002
 Ron Jackson: 2003–2006
 Dave Magadan: 2007–2012
 Greg Colbrunn: 2013–2014 (leave of absence during June 2014)
 Tim Hyers: June 5, 2014 – June 29, 2014 (interim)
 Chili Davis: 2015–2017
 Tim Hyers: 2018–2021
 Peter Fatse: 2022–present

Assistant hitting coach 
 Vic Rodriguez: 2013–2017
 Andy Barkett: 2018–2019
 Peter Fatse: 2020–2021
 Luis Ortiz: 2022–present
 Ben Rosenthal: 2022–present

Pitching coach 

 Jimmy Burke: 1921–1923
 Jack Ryan: 1923–1927
 Jack Onslow: 1934
 Herb Pennock: 1936–April 28, 1939
 Frank Shellenback: 1940–1944
 Bill McKechnie: 1952–1953
 Joe Dobson: May 11, 1954 – July 2, 1954
 Dave Ferriss: 1955–1959
 Sal Maglie: 1960–1962, 1966–1967
 Harry Dorish: 1963
 Bob Turley: 1964
 Mace Brown: 1965
 Darrell Johnson: 1968–1969
 Charlie Wagner: 1970
 Harvey Haddix: 1971
 Lee Stange: 1972–1974, 1981–1984
 Stan Williams: 1975–1976
 Al Jackson: 1977–1979
 Johnny Podres: 1980
 Bill Fischer: 1985–1991
 Rich Gale: 1992–1993
 Mike Roarke: 1994
 John Cumberland: 1995 – July 19, 1995
 Al Nipper: July 19, 1995 – May 1, 1996
 Sammy Ellis: May 1, 1996 – end of season
 Joe Kerrigan: 1997 – August 16, 2001
 John Cumberland: August 16, 2001 – September 4, 2001
 Ralph Treuel: September 4, 2001 – end of season
 Tony Cloninger: 2002 – May 29, 2003 (on leave during April 2003)
 Goose Gregson: April 5, 2003 – April 22, 2003 (interim); May 30, 2003 – June 8, 2003 (interim)
 Dave Wallace: June 9, 2003 – 2006 (on leave for first four months of 2006 season)
 Al Nipper: 2006 – August 8, 2006 (interim)
 John Farrell: 2007–2010
 Curt Young: 2011
 Bob McClure: 2012 – August 20, 2012
 Randy Niemann: August 20, 2012 – end of season
 Juan Nieves: 2013 – May 7, 2015
 Carl Willis: May 9, 2015 – 2017
 Dana LeVangie: 2018–2020
 Dave Bush: 2020–present

Assistant pitching coach 
 Randy Niemann: 2012 – August 20, 2012
 Brian Bannister: July 6, 2016 – 2019

Bullpen coach 

 Johnny Schulte: 1949
 George Susce: 1950–1954
 Mickey Owen: 1955–1956
 Len Okrie: 1961–1962
 Al Lakeman: 1963–1964
 Len Okrie: 1965–1966
 Al Lakeman: 1967 – June 9, 1969
 George Thomas: June 10, 1969 – end of season
 Doug Camilli: 1970–1973
 Don Bryant: 1974–1976
 Walt Hriniak: 1977–1984
 Tony Torchia: 1985
 Joe Morgan: 1986
 Rac Slider: 1987 – July 10, 1988
 Jerry McNertney: July 15, 1988–end of season
 Dick Berardino: 1989–1990
 John McLaren: 1991
 Gary Allenson: 1992–1993
 John Wathan: 1994
 Herm Starrette: 1995
 Dave Carlucci: 1996–May 1, 1996
 Herm Starrette: May 1, 1996–1997
 Dick Pole: 1998
 John Cumberland: 1999 – August 15, 2001
 Dana LeVangie: August 16, 2001 – end of season
 Bob Kipper: 2002
 Euclides Rojas: 2003–2004
 Bill Hasselman: 2005
 Al Nipper: 2006 (served as interim pitching coach for first four months of the season)
 Ralph Treuel: 2006–August 8, 2006 (interim)
 Gary Tuck: 2007–2012
 Dana LeVangie: 2013–2017 (on leave for final two months of 2015 season)
 Bob Kipper: August 16, 2015 – end of 2015 season (interim)
 Craig Bjornson: 2018–2020
 Kevin Walker: 2021–present

Others

Current
 Jason Varitek: Game Planning Coordinator (2021–present) / Catching (2022–present)
 Reed Gragnani: 2022–present (Assistant Hitting Coordinator)
 Michael Brenly: 2022–present (Staff Assistant)
 Andy Fox: 2022–present (Field Coordinator)

Past
 Lefty Leifield: 1924–1926
 Heinie Wagner: 1927–1929
 Bob Coleman: 1928
 Jack McCallister: 1930
 Hugh Duffy: 1931
 Rudy Hulswitt: 1931–1933
 Bibb Falk: 1934
 Tom Daly: 1933–1936, 1944–1946
 Moe Berg: 1939
 Paul Schreiber: 1946–1958 (batting practice pitcher)
 Tom Carey: 1946–1947
 Larry Woodall: 1948
 Johnny Schulte: 1950
 Del Baker: 1959–1960
 Eddie Popowski: 1975 (Special Assignment)
 Nelson Norman: 2001 (Infield Coach)
 Ramón Vázquez: 2018–2021 (Quality Control Coach/Interpreter)

Notes 
 For the 1923 season, both Jimmy Burke and Jack Ryan were listed as pitching coaches.
 Herb Pennock resigned as pitching/1st base coach on April 28, 1939, to become Assistant Supervisor of Boston farm system. He was succeeded by Hugh Duffy.
 For the 1947 to 1958 seasons, Paul Schreiber is listed as hitting coach, however other sources note his role as batting practice pitcher, which is consistent with his major league playing experience.
 For the 1959 to 1962 seasons, Rudy York was both the first base coach and hitting coach.
 For the 1967 to 1969 seasons, Bobby Doerr was both the first base coach and hitting coach.
 For 1970, George Thomas is listed as bullpen coach for the full season, however other sources note his coaching role was for a limited time, which is consistent with game logs showing he was an active player for several months.
 On July 19, 1976, Don Zimmer moved from third base coach to manager, and Eddie Popowski replaced him as third base coach.
 At the start of the 1986 season, hitting coach Walt Hriniak also assumed the duties of first base coach when Joe Morgan moved to bullpen coach.
 On July 15, 1988, Joe Morgan moved from third base coach to manager, bullpen coach Rac Slider replaced him as third base coach, and Jerry McNertney became the new bullpen coach.
 On July 25, 1992, Don Zimmer moved from third base coach to bench coach, and Rick Burleson assumed the duties of third base coach while still serving as hitting coach.
 On July 19, 1995, Al Nipper replaced John Cumberland as pitching coach.
 On May 1, 1996, pitching coach Al Nipper was reassigned to minor league pitching coordinator and replaced by Sammy Ellis, and bullpen coach Dave Carlucci was reassigned to bullpen catcher and replaced by Herm Starrette.
 On August 16, 2001, bullpen coach John Cumberland replaced Joe Kerrigan as pitching coach when Kerrigan was promoted to manager, and bullpen catcher Dana LeVangie replaced Cumberland as bullpen coach.
 On September 4, 2001, pitching coach John Cumberland was fired and replaced by Ralph Treuel.
 On June 9, 2003, Dave Wallace replaced Tony Cloninger as pitching coach when Cloninger left the team to receive treatment for cancer; Goose Gregson had filled in for Cloninger during April 5–23 and again May 30–June 8.
 During 2004, from May 6 to July 22, Bill Haselman filled in for first base coach Lynn Jones who required eye surgery after accidentally poking himself with a screwdriver.
 During 2006, Dave Wallace missed much of the season due to illness; bullpen coach Al Nipper served as interim pitching coach and Ralph Treuel serving as interim bullpen coach until Wallace's return on August 8.
 In August 2015, due to manager John Farrell's leave of absence for cancer treatment, bench coach Torey Lovullo was elevated to interim manager, bullpen coach Dana LeVangie was elevated to interim bench coach, and Triple-A pitching coach Bob Kipper was promoted to Boston's bullpen coach.
 During the 2021 season, Ramón Vázquez served as interim first base coach for several games during August, and multiple games in late September through the postseason, as Tom Goodwin was unavailable due to COVID-19 protocols.

References

External links
 
 
 

 
coaches
Boston Red Sox